Shellshock or shell shock may refer to:

 Shell shock, a term coined to describe the reaction of some soldiers in World War I, or any war, to the trauma of battle

Games
 M&M's: Shell Shocked, a video game
 Shellshock: Nam '67, a 2004 video game
 Shellshock (video game)
 ShellShock Live, a 2015 artillery video game

Music
 Shell Shocked (album), a 1998 album by Mac
 Shell Shock (band), a metal band from New Orleans
 Shell Shock (opera), a 2014 opera by Nicholas Lens

Songs
 "Shellshock" (song), by New Order
 "Shellshock", by Die Krupps on the album Rings of Steel
 "Shellshock", by Love Battery on the album Between the Eyes
 "Shell Shock", by Heart on the album Heart
 "Shell Shock", by Manowar on the album Battle Hymns
 "Shellshock", by Tank from album Filth Hounds of Hades
 "Shell Shock", by Gym Class Heroes from soundtrack album Teenage Mutant Ninja Turtles: Music from the Motion Picture
 "Shell Shocked" (song), a song by Juicy J, Wiz Khalifa and Ty Dolla Sign 
 "Shellshock", by Sad Café, 1977
 "Shellshock", by Onslaught, 1989

Other uses
 Shellshock (Marvel Comics), a Marvel Comics character
 Shellshock (software bug), a security hole in the Bash computer shell
 Shellshock (wildlife protection organisation), formed to protect tortoises and turtles
 Shell Shock (film), a 1964 movie
 Shell Shock (novella), a Doctor Who novella
 "Shell Shocked" (SpongeBob SquarePants), an episode of SpongeBob SquarePants
 Teenage Mutant Ninja Turtles Shell Shock, an amusement ride at Nickelodeon Universe
 Shell Shock (Part I) and Shell Shock (Part II), a two-part episode in season 10 of NCIS